Candijay, officially the Municipality of Candijay,  is a 4th class municipality in the province of Bohol, Philippines. According to the 2020 census, it has a population of 30,119 people.

Candijay is home to the Bohol Island State University (BISU) School of Fisheries, offering college courses related to modern fishing methods and fish preservation. It also has educational facilities for elementary and secondary levels in almost all barangays of the municipality.

Camdijay is bounded by Alicia and Mabini to the north and Guindulman to the south.

History

The name of the town is said to have come from the words "Kang Dihay" meaning belonging to Dihay, a strong man with many followers. The name was eventually changed to Candijay and was organized during the Spanish regime and was then one of the 34 towns in the province in 1879 with a population of 5,030.

The municipality of Candijay was one of the 34 towns established during the Spanish regime in 1879 and so was its establishment as a parish. The people were eventually converted to the Roman Catholic religion by the Spaniards. The parochial church of Candijay is dedicated to Saint Joseph whose feast day is 19 May.

Geography

The municipality of Candijay is located on the eastern side of Bohol,  from Tagbilaran, a two-hour ride away.

The town faces Cogtong Bay which has the most diverse mangrove ecosystem in Bohol. The bay is home to 32 of the Philippines' 47 species of mangroves and associates. Yet due to illegal fishing and mismanagement of the mangroves, the mangroves and marine life in the area dwindled. To rectify the damage done, the municipal government is now engaged in a coastal resource management program: the planting of mangroves, though the control and eventual abolition of illegal fishing has yet to be addressed.

Barangays

Candijay comprises 21 barangays.

Climate

Demographics

Economy

Tourism

Candijay has several natural resources. Among these which consequently are visited by both foreign and local tourists are the Canumantad Falls which is still being developed, the pristine cold spring Canawa Spring, in Canawa and the Kawasihan Islet Sand Bar in Panas.

There are also some potential eco-tourism destination which consequently start to attract visitors such as the Layog Caves in Luan, Sangat Cave in Tambongan and Ilaja Cave in Panas; the hinterland rice terraces in Tambongan, Canawa, Cadapdapan, Tubod and Abihilan; Danicop Gorge Brook in Cambane; the Kantaligsok Peak which is said to be the tallest peak found in Tugas; as well as the Candijay Mangrove Forests in Panadtaran. The community-based Panadtaran Mangrove Association (PAMAS), which seeks to preserve Panadtaran's mangroves and other natural resources in the area and promote them for eco-tourism pursuits, has now established the Candijay Mangrove Adventure Tour.

Candijay also boasts a man-made lake known as Boongon SWI.

Education

Gallery

References

External links

 [ Philippine Standard Geographic Code]
Candijay
Municipality of Candijay

Municipalities of Bohol